Cumby is a city in Hopkins County, Texas, United States. The population was 777 at the 2010 census, up from 616 at the 2000 census. In 2020, its population was 679.

History 
Originally known as Black Jack Grove as early as 1848, from 1857 to 1858 the post office was renamed to Theodocias. It was renamed again to Black Jack Grove before being renamed a final time to Cumby in 1896. It was named for Confederate army veteran Robert H. Cumby (1825-1881).

Geography

Cumby is located in western Hopkins County at  (33.135235, –95.840141). Interstate 30 runs through the south side of the city, with access from Exit 110. I-30 leads east  to Sulphur Springs, the Hopkins county seat, and west  to downtown Dallas.

The city sits on a watershed divide, with the north side draining towards the South Sulphur River, part of the Red River watershed, and the south side of the city draining towards Lake Fork Creek, part of the Sabine River watershed.

Climate
Cumby is part of the humid subtropical climate region.

Demographics

According to the 2020 United States census, there were 679 people, 321 households, and 222 families residing in the city. At the census of 2000, there were 616 people, 262 households, and 178 families residing in the city. The population density was 708.1 people per square mile (273.4/km2). There were 292 housing units at an average density of 335.6 per square mile (129.6/km2). The racial makeup of the city was 97.56% White, 0.65% Native American, 0.97% from other races, and 0.81% from two or more races. Hispanic or Latino of any race were 2.60% of the population.

There were 262 households, out of which 26.7% had children under the age of 18 living with them, 52.7% were married couples living together, 10.3% had a female householder with no husband present, and 31.7% were non-families. 27.5% of all households were made up of individuals, and 16.4% had someone living alone who was 65 years of age or older. The average household size was 2.35 and the average family size was 2.87.

In the city, the population was spread out, with 22.9% under the age of 18, 7.6% from 18 to 24, 29.2% from 25 to 44, 21.6% from 45 to 64, and 18.7% who were 65 years of age or older. The median age was 39 years. For every 100 females, there were 98.1 males. For every 100 females age 18 and over, there were 91.5 males.

The median income for a household in the city was $30,547, and the median income for a family was $34,091. Males had a median income of $25,833 versus $19,643 for females. The per capita income for the city was $15,228. About 7.0% of families and 11.9% of the population were below the poverty line, including 9.6% of those under age 18 and 15.9% of those age 65 or over.

Education
The city is served by the Cumby Independent School District.

External links 
City of Cumby official website

References

Cities in Texas
Cities in Hopkins County, Texas